The following is a list of the 23 municipalities (comuni) of the former Province of Ogliastra, Sardinia, Italy.

See also 
List of municipalities of Italy

References 

Ogliastra